Disambiguation:  This wikipage is about a group of churches holding Trinitarian beliefs.  For the Oneness  Pentecostal movement called United Pentecostal Church or United Pentecostal Church International or UPCI, see United Pentecostal Church International. 

United Pentecostal Churches of Christ was a name used from 1992 until at least 2004 as the name of a Pentecostal Holiness denomination in the United States of America.

History
The organization was formed during 1992 as a result of a meeting convened by Bishop (now Archbishop) J. Delano Ellis.  The offices were at Cleveland, Ohio.

See also:

  Pentecostal Churches of Christ, an organization based at Cleveland, Ohio, and led (as at 2014) by Bishop Ellis.   (Please note omission of the initial word "United"). 
  United Covenant Churches of Christ, an organization now (2014) based at Brooklyn, New York, and led (as at 2014) by Bishop Eric Daniel Garnes.

Distinguishing characteristics
A notable characteristic of the United Pentecostal Churches of Christ is that they have sought to combine Pentecostal Holiness teaching and practice with an ecclesiology and theology that is at once evangelical, pentecostal, sacramental, ceremonial and celebratory.

There are similarities with the Convergence Movement and with aspects of the independent sacramental movement.

A specific and notable feature of the approach adopted by United Pentecostal Churches of Christ has been a desire to honor the ancient apostolic succession through the laying-on of a bishop's hands during ordination.

Notes

References

Categories

Charismatic and Pentecostal organizations
Christian organizations based in the United States
Pentecostal denominations
Evangelical denominations in North America